This article gives an overview of liberalism in Croatia. Liberals became active since 1860 in Dalmatia and since 1904 in the rest of Croatia. It never became a major political party. It is limited to liberal parties with substantial support, mainly proved by having had a representation in parliament. The sign ⇒ denotes another party in that scheme. For inclusion in this scheme it isn't necessary so that parties labeled themselves as a liberal party.

History
After the restoration of democracy in 1989 liberalism became very divided. At the moment (August, 2017) one could distinguish five parties: the right of center Croatian Social Liberal Party (Hrvatska socijalno-liberalna stranka, member LI, ELDR), two center liberal parties: Croatian People's Party-Liberal Democrats (Hrvatska narodna stranka - liberalni demokrati, observer LI, member ELDR) and People's Party - Reformists (Narodna stranka – reformisti, member EDP), while left of center is Civic Liberal Alliance (Građansko-liberalni savez, GLAS). Reformists and GLAS are formed from dissidents of the Croatian People's Party-Liberal Democrats. Istrian Democratic Assembly (Istarski demokratski sabor - Dieta Democratica Istriana, member EDP) is considered as  Istrian regionalist, but also as a liberal party. Main media exponents of Croatian liberalism or liberal ideas include or included newspapers Novi list and Glas Istre, culture magazine Zarez and the defunct weekly Feral Tribune.

1860–1945
National Party (People's Party)
1860: National liberals formed in Dalmatia the National party known also as the People's Party (Narodna stranka). The party developed into a conservative party around 1889.

From Progressive Party to Progressive Democratic Party
1904: Progressive liberals formed in the Kingdom of Croatia-Slavonia the Progressive Party (Napredna stranka)
1906: The NS merged with the ⇒ Democratic Party into the Croatian People's Progressive Party (Hrvatska pučka napredna stranka)
1910: The party merged with the Croatian Party of Rights (Hrvatska stranka prava) into the Croatian Independent Party (Hrvatska samostalna stranka)
1918: The party is reorganised into the Progressive Democratic Party (Napredna demokratska stranka)
1919: The party became part of the conservative Croatian Community (Hrvatska zajednica)

Democratic Party (Dalmatia)
1906: Dalmatian liberals formed the Democratic Party (Demokratska stranka)
1908: The DS merged into the ⇒ Croatian People's Progressive Party

From Democratic Community to Democratic Party (Yugoslavia)
1919: Croatian liberals became part of the Yugoslav State Party of Serbian, Croatian and Slovene Democrats (Državnotvorna stranka demokrata Srba, Hrvata i Slovenaca)
1919: The party is renamed into the Democratic Community (Demokratska zajednica)
1920: The party is renamed into the Democratic Party (Demokratska stranka)
1924: A faction formed the ⇒ Independent Democratic Party
1945: The party is dissolved

Independent Democratic Party
1924: The former Serbian Independent Party seceded from the ⇒ Democratic Party and constituted the Independent Democratic Party (Samostalna demokratska stranka), led by Svetozar Pribićević, mainly active in the Serbian population of Croatia
1945: The party is dissolved

1989–present
Croatian Social Liberal Union / Croatian Social Liberal Party
1989: Liberals formed the Croatian Social Liberal Union (Hrvatski socijalno-liberalni savez), renamed in 1990 into the Croatian Social Liberal Party (Hrvatska socijalno-liberalna stranka)
1998: A left-wing faction formed the ⇒ Liberal Party
2002: A faction secedes to form the ⇒ Party of Liberal Democrats

Croatian People's Party – Liberal Democrats
1990: Dissident communists formed the liberal Croatian People's Party (Hrvatska narodna stranka)
2005: The ⇒ Party of Liberal Democrats merges into the party, which is renamed into Croatian People's Party-Liberal Democrats (Hrvatska narodna stranka - liberalni demokrati)
2014: A faction secedes to form the ⇒ People's Party - Reformists
2017: A left-wing faction formed the ⇒ Civic Liberal Alliance

Liberal Party
1998: A left-wing faction of the ⇒ Croatian Social Liberal Party formed the Liberal Party (Liberalna stranka)
2006: The majority of the Liberal Party merges into the ⇒Croatian Social Liberal Party.

Party of Liberal Democrats
2002: A faction of the ⇒ Croatian Social Liberal Party led by Jozo Radoš formed the Party of Liberal Democrats (LIBRA - Stranka liberalnih demokrata)
2003: LIBRA wins three Parliament seats
February 6, 2005: most of the 248 representatives of Libra on its second convention voted to merge with the Croatian People's Party
2005: The party of Liberal Democrats merges into the ⇒ Croatian People's Party, which is renamed into Croatian People's Party-Liberal Democrats

People's Party - Reformists 
2014: A faction led by former party leader Radimir Čačić left the ⇒Croatian People's Party – Liberal Democrats to form People's Party - Reformists (Narodna stranka - reformisti).

Civic Liberal Alliance
July, 2017: A faction of the ⇒Croatian People's Party – Liberal Democrats led by Anka Mrak Taritaš, MP (and 2017 Zagreb mayoress candidate) together with three other MPs formed the Civic Liberal Alliance (Građansko-liberalni savez known as GLAS), after the majority of the Croatian People's Party-Liberal Democrats had concluded the coalition agreement with the right of center Croatian Democratic Union and entered into the Cabinet of Andrej Plenković.

Liberal leaders

 Svetozar Pribićević
 Savka Dabčević-Kučar
 Dražen Budiša
 Vesna Pusić
 Radimir Čačić
 Anka Mrak-Taritaš

Liberal thinkers

 Antun Gustav Matoš
 Ante Trumbić
 Ivan Lorković
 Stjepan Radić
 Bogdan Raditsa
 Vlado Gotovac

See also
 History of Croatia
 Politics of Croatia

References

Sources

External links
 KAKO JE NACIONALIZAM U POTPUNOSTI PORAZIO LIBERALIZAM U HRVATA Suosnivači i ključni ljudi HSLS-a, prve hrvatske stranke, govore za Globus 

Croatia
Politics of Croatia